Ammonium cyanate is an inorganic compound with the formula . It is a colorless, solid salt.

Structure and reactions

The structure of this salt was verified by X-ray crystallography. The respective C–O and C–N distances are 1.174(8) and 1.192(7) Å, consistent with the  description. Ammonium cation  forms hydrogen bonds with cyanate anion , but to N, not to O.

The compound is notable as the precursor in the Wöhler synthesis of urea, an organic compound, from inorganic reactants. This led to the discarding of the Vital force theory, suggested earlier by Berzelius.

References

Cyanates
Ammonium compounds